Events from the year 1828 in Canada.

Incumbents
Monarch: George IV

Federal government
Parliament of Lower Canada: 13th 
Parliament of Upper Canada: 9th (until March 25)

Governors
Governor of the Canadas: Robert Milnes
Governor of New Brunswick: George Stracey Smyth
Governor of Nova Scotia: John Coape Sherbrooke
Civil Governor of Newfoundland: Thomas John Cochrane
Governor of Prince Edward Island: Charles Douglass Smith

Events
William Lyon Mackenzie elected to the Assembly with the first Reform majority.
Settlement begins in Stratford, Ontario
A memorandum is sent by the Parti Patriote to the British Parliament listing grievances over lack of power for the elected assembly and other issues.

Births
January 23 – John Carling, businessman and politician (died 1911)
April 1 – William Whiteway, politician and three time Premier of Newfoundland (died 1908)
May 25 – James McIntyre, poet (died 1906)
October 5 – Alexander Gunn, politician (died 1907)

Deaths
 Tête Jaune, trapper

References 

 
Canada
Years of the 19th century in Canada
1828 in North America